Mount Whittier is a mountain in Carroll County, New Hampshire, in the northern Ossipee Mountains. Named after John Greenleaf Whittier, the peak is not to be confused with nearby Nickerson Mountain, which was once known as Mount Whittier.

There are no hiking trails on Mount Whittier. There was once a CCC alpine ski trail on the northern face.

See also

 List of mountains in New Hampshire

External links
 Mt. Whittier - New England's Alpine CCC Ski Trails

Mountains of New Hampshire
Mountains of Carroll County, New Hampshire